Vera Cruz is a 1954 American Western film directed by Robert Aldrich and starring Gary Cooper and Burt Lancaster, featuring Denise Darcel, Sara Montiel, Cesar Romero, Ernest Borgnine, Charles Bronson and Jack Elam. Set during the Franco-Mexican War, the film centers on a group of American mercenaries tasked with transporting a large shipment of Imperial gold to the port of Veracruz, but begin to have second thoughts about their allegiances. It was produced by Hecht-Lancaster Productions and released by United Artists on 25 December 1954.

The picture's amoral characters and cynical attitude towards violence (including a scene where Lancaster's character threatens to murder child hostages) were considered shocking at the time and influenced future Westerns such as The Magnificent Seven (1960), The Professionals (1966), Sam Peckinpah's The Wild Bunch (1969), and the Spaghetti Western films of Sergio Leone, which often featured supporting cast members from Vera Cruz in similar roles. Its influence on the latter led some critics to label it "the first Spaghetti Western."

Plot 
During the Franco-Mexican War, ex-Confederate soldier Ben Trane travels to Mexico seeking a job as a mercenary. He falls in with Joe Erin, a younger gunslinger who heads a gang of cutthroats. They are recruited by Marquis Henri de Labordere for service with Emperor Maximilian. Maximilian offers them $25,000 to escort the Countess Duvarre to the city of Veracruz. Trane gets the emperor to double the offer.

During a river crossing, Trane notices that the stagecoach in which the countess is traveling is extremely heavy. Erin and Trane later discover that hidden inside are six cases of gold coins. The countess informs them that it is worth $3 million which is intended to pay for reinforcements from Europe. They form an uneasy alliance to steal and split the gold. Unbeknownst to them, the marquis is listening from the shadows.

The Juaristas, led by General Ramírez, attack the column several times. Pickpocket and Juarista undercover agent Nina joins the convoy. When Trane, Erin and their men are surrounded by the Juaristas, Trane persuades Ramirez to join forces and agree to pay them $100,000. The marquis succeeds in getting the gold to Veracruz. In the Juarista attack, the French are defeated, but most of Erin's men are killed. Erin attempts to steal the gold for himself by getting the countess to reveal the location of the ship she had hired to transport it. He even kills one of his own men. However, Trane arrives in time to confront him. They face off in a showdown that ends in Erin's death. Trane and Nina leave, while women search the dead for their loved ones.

Cast

Production 

Burt Lancaster and Harold Hecht had just signed a contract with United Artists to make two films, starting with Apache, also directed by Robert Aldrich. Just before filming on that movie began in October 1953, Lancaster announced their second film would be Vera Cruz with himself and Gary Cooper, based on a story by Borden Chase.

In December 1953, after Apache finished filming, Lancaster announced Aldrich would direct Vera Cruz.

United Artists were so happy with Apache they changed the two-picture deal with Hecht and Lancaster into a two-year deal covering seven films.

Casting 
Before taking the role of Ben Trane, Gary Cooper was advised by Clark Gable not to work with Burt Lancaster, fearing the younger actor would upstage him.

Mari Blanchard was meant to play the female lead and Hecht signed to borrow her from Universal. However, there was a clause forbidding her to appear on television which Hecht disagreed with. Instead they cast Denise Darcel. Mamie Van Doren claimed in her autobiography Playing the Field that Lancaster interviewed her for the role of the Countess, but she lost the part after refusing to sleep with him.

Charles Bronson was billed under his real name, 'Charles Buchinsky', in the film. It was the last time he would be credited that way, before adopting his more well-known stage name.

Shooting 
Filming started in February 1954. Vera Cruz was the first American film production to be shot entirely in Mexico. Though set in the city of Veracruz, the majority of the film was actually shot in and around Cuernavaca. Exterior shots were filmed at Chapultepec Castle in Mexico City, the ruins of Teotihuacan, and the climax was shot at Molino de Flores Nezahualcóyotl National Park in Texcoco de Mora. The interiors were filmed at Estudios Churubusco.

Vera Cruz was also the first production to use the SuperScope widescreen process, which was designed to achieve anamorphic prints from standard flat 35mm negatives. Shot at a conventional 1.37:1 aspect ratio, the film was cropped to 2:1 in post-production, given a CinemaScope-compatible (2x) squeeze, and blown up to normal frame height. .

Aldrich and Lancaster got along well on Apache but as to Vera Cruz, the director said "we probably had a less amicable relationship than we anticipated. This was because Burt, until he directed The Kentuckian, thought he was going to be a director and when you're directing your first great big picture you don't welcome somebody else on hand with directorial notions. There were a few differences of opinion about concepts and about action." Lancaster recalled that Cooper demanded rewrites to his character to make him less morally-gray and more conventionally heroic.

According to Eli Wallach, the Mexican authorities were appalled at the unflattering depiction of their country, so any subsequent Hollywood productions (including The Magnificent Seven) were thoroughly overseen by state censors.

Reception 
The film earned an estimated $5 million at the North American box office during its first run and $9 million overall. The movie was a particularly big hit in France.

In 1963, Aldrich announced he was working on a sequel There Really Was a Gold Mine but it was never made.

Legacy 
Critic and historian Dave Kehr would later cite Vera Cruz as one of the most influential films of the 1950s, inspiring later Westerns by such directors as Sam Peckinpah and especially Sergio Leone. Kehr also praised Cooper and Lancaster's performances in the film, writing that "the generational transition from an aging star to his up-and-coming replacement has seldom been handled with better humor or more biting wit."

Home media 
Vera Cruz was released to DVD by MGM Home Video on April 1, 2003, and to Blu-Ray on June 7, 2011.

See also 
 You Can't Win 'Em All, a 1970 film with a similar plot set in the Greco-Turkish War.

References

External links 
 
 
 

1950s buddy films
1954 Western (genre) films
1954 films
American buddy films
American Western (genre) films
Cultural depictions of Maximilian I of Mexico
Films about mercenaries
Films directed by Robert Aldrich
Films produced by Burt Lancaster
Films produced by Harold Hecht
Films produced by James Hill
Films scored by Hugo Friedhofer
Films set in Mexico
Films shot in Mexico
Norma Productions films
Second French intervention in Mexico films
United Artists films
Revisionist Western (genre) films
Estudios Churubusco films